Life... and Stuff is an American sitcom that aired on CBS in 1997 starring Rick Reynolds.

Plot
Advertising executive Rick Boswell, and his wife, Ronnie, are a couple married ten years and feeling overwhelmed by life.  Sharing their home are their two young sons and Rick's man-child brother.

Cast
Rick Reynolds as Rick Boswell	
Pam Dawber as Ronnie Boswell	
Fred Applegate as Bernie Skabinsky	
Tanner Lee Prairie as Jerry Boswell	
Kevin Keckeisen as Shawn Boswell	
David Bowe as Andy Boswell

Episodes

References

External links

1990s American sitcoms
1997 American television series debuts
1997 American television series endings
CBS original programming
English-language television shows
Television series by Sony Pictures Television